Catherine Deroche (born 24 February 1953) is a French politician. She represents the department of Maine-et-Loire in the French Senate as a Union for a Popular Movement member.

Deroche was mayor of Bouchemaine from 1999 to 2008. She also served as chair of the Association départementale des maires. She is a member of the Regional council and secretary for the UMP in Maine-et-Loire.

Ahead of the 2022 presidential elections, Deroche publicly declared her support for Michel Barnier as the Republicans’ candidate.

References 

1953 births
Living people
French Senators of the Fifth Republic
The Republicans (France) politicians
Union for a Popular Movement politicians
Women mayors of places in France
People from Maine-et-Loire
20th-century French women politicians
21st-century French women politicians
Women members of the Senate (France)
Senators of Maine-et-Loire
Mayors of places in Pays de la Loire